Julien Masson (born 18 June 1998) is a French professional footballer who plays as a midfielder for the French club Valenciennes FC in the Ligue 2.

Professional career
Born in Valenciennes, Masson began playing for local side Valenciennes FC at age 13. Masson made his professional debut for Valenciennes in a Ligue 2 0–0 tie with Red Star on 5 May 2017. On 13 November 2017, Masson signed his first professional contract with Valenciennes, keeping him at the club for 4 years.

Depsite an aborted summer transfer to Ligue 1 side Angers SCO, Masson was a mainstay in Valenciennes' squad, making 34 league appearances as he was voted the club's 2019 player of the year by the editorial staff of La Voix du Nord.

References

External links
 
 
 
 Valenciennes Profile

1998 births
Living people
Sportspeople from Valenciennes
Association football midfielders
French footballers
Valenciennes FC players
Ligue 2 players
Championnat National 3 players
Footballers from Hauts-de-France